is a Japanese actor.  He is the eldest son of actor Tetsurō Tamba.
He played Goro Sakurai in JAKQ Dengekitai in which he dated Mitchi Love

Biography 
In 1973, while attending high school, he landed a part in the movie Sumi yuriko directed by Omori Kenziro.  He also appeared in the movie Aoba shigeru reru around the same time.  Yoshitaka also extended his film career into television acting with the 1975 NHK television series Mizuiro no toki.  In 1977, Yoshitaka and his father Tetsuro appeared in the film Alaska Monogatari.

Yoshitaka graduated from Tokyo Toritsu Suginami High School.  He continued his education at Seijo University but dropped out before graduating.  Yoshitaka has been multiple movies and television series since his debut.

Filmography

Films
  (1973) - Masao
  (1974) - Minoru Tajima
  (1974)
  (1975)
  (1975)
  (1975)
  (1976)
  (1977)
  (1977) - Goroh Sakurai / Spade Ace
  (1978)
  (1979)
  (1979)
  (1981)
  (1985)
  (1985)
  (1986)
  (1987)
  (1987)
  (1988)
  (1990)
  (1994)
  (1995)
  (1998)
  (2004)
  (2005)

TV Dramas
  (1975 NHK)
  (1975 TBS)
  (1977 ANB) - Goroh Sakurai / Spade Ace
  (1978 NHK)
  (1979 NHK)
  (1979 NHK)
 Irashaimase!''(1980 KTV)
  (1979 ABC)
  (1981 NTV)
  (1982 TBS)
  (1984 ANB)
  (1985 NHK)
  (1985 ABC)
  (1986 KTV)
  (1986 ABC)
  (1987)
  (1987 CBC)
  (1987)
  (1988 NHK)
  (1988 TBS)
  (1990 TBS)
  (1990)
  (1990 ANB)
  (1993 TX)
  (1997 TBS)
  (1994 NHK)
  (1995 NHK)
  (1995 NHK)
  (1996 TX)
  (1997 TBS)
  (2000 NHK), Sakai Tadakatsu
  (2000 NHK)
  (2002 CBC)
  (2002 NTV)
  (2003 NHK)
  (2005 CBC)

References

External links
Official Site

1955 births
Living people
Japanese male actors